Fuadi Ndayisenga (born 15 June 1989 in Bujumbura) is a Burundian footballer who currently plays for Sofapaka in the Kenyan Premier League and the Burundi national team as a midfielder.

Club career
On 24 June 2015, it was announced that Ndayisenga joined Kenyan side Sofapaka, after spending ten years in Burundi and Rwanda with Vital'O, A.P.R., Kiyovu Sports and Rayon Sports. On 27 June 2015, he made his debut for the club in 1–0 league win over Western Stima, playing 82 minutes before being substituted by Erastus Mwaniki at the Kenyatta Stadium in Machakos.

International career
Ndayisenga made his debut for the Burundi national team on 1 June 2008 against Seychelles.

References

External links
 
 

1989 births
Living people
Sportspeople from Bujumbura
Association football midfielders
Burundian footballers
Burundi international footballers
Vital'O F.C. players
Burundian expatriate footballers
Burundian expatriate sportspeople in Rwanda
Expatriate footballers in Rwanda
APR F.C. players
S.C. Kiyovu Sports players
Rayon Sports F.C. players
Burundian expatriate sportspeople in Kenya
Expatriate footballers in Kenya
Sofapaka F.C. players
Kenyan Premier League players